id Tech 2 may refer to the following game engines developed by id Software:

 Quake engine
 QuakeWorld
 Quake II engine

See also 
 id Tech